Slave is the self-titled debut studio album by the American R&B/funk band Slave. It was released in 1977 through Cotillion Records. Recording sessions took place at Century Sound Studios in Sayreville, New Jersey. Production was handled by Jeff Dixon.

The album peaked at number 22 on the Billboard 200 and number six on the Top R&B/Hip-Hop Albums. It was certified gold by the Recording Industry Association of America on June 14, 1977. Its lead single, "Slide", made it to number 32 on the Billboard Hot 100, topped the US Hot R&B/Hip-Hop Songs chart, and also reached number 58 in Canadian Singles Chart.

Track listing

Personnel
Stephen C. "The Fearless Leader" Washington – songwriter, backing vocals, percussion, trumpet, arrangement, concept
Mark "Drac" Hicks – songwriter, backing vocals, lead and rhythm guitar, arrangement
Mark Leslie "Mr. Mark"/"The Hansolor" Adams – songwriter, bass, arrangement
Daniel "Danny" Webster – songwriter, lead and backing vocals, lead and rhythm guitar, arrangement
Tom "Tiny" Dozier – songwriter, lead vocals, drums, percussion, arrangement
Floyd "The Brother Slide" Miller – songwriter, lead and backing vocals, percussion, trumpet, trombone, arrangement
Tom Lockett Jr. – songwriter, alto and tenor saxophone, arrangement
Orion "Bimmy" Wilhoite – songwriter, alto and tenor saxophone, arrangement
Carter Charles Bradley – songwriter, keyboards, arrangement
Jeff Dixon – producer, concept
Bob Ligotino – recording
Jimmy Douglass – re-mixing
Abie Sussman – art direction
Bob Defrin – art direction
Shig Ikeda – photography
Benno Friedman – photography

Charts

Weekly charts

Year-end charts

Certifications

References

External links

1977 debut albums
Slave (band) albums
Cotillion Records albums